Seven warships of Sweden have been named Gripen, after Gripen:

 , a warship launched in 1677.
 , a galley launched in 1713.
 , a frigate launched in 1715.
 , a frigate launched in 1750.
 , a frigate launched in 1775.
 , a  launched in 1928 and stricken in 1947.
 , a  launched in 1960 and stricken in 1989.

Swedish Navy ship names